The Men's Javelin Throw event at the 1983 World Championships in Helsinki, Finland had a total number of 18 participating athletes, with the final held on 12 August 1983. All results were made with old rules javelin. The qualification mark was set at 84.00 metres.

Medalists

Schedule
All times are Eastern European Time (UTC+2)

Abbreviations
All results shown are in metres

Startlist
World list as of August 6, 1983, just before the start of the competition

Records

Qualification

Group A

Group B

Final

See also
 1980 Men's Olympic Javelin Throw (Moscow)
 1982 Men's European Championships Javelin Throw (Athens)
 1984 Men's Olympic Javelin Throw (Los Angeles)
 1986 Men's European Championships Javelin Throw (Stuttgart)

References
 Results
 IAAF Results
koti.welho

J
Javelin throw at the World Athletics Championships